Holzheim may refer to several places in Europe:

Germany

Bavaria
Holzheim, Dillingen, in the district of Dillingen 
Holzheim, Donau-Ries, in the Donau-Ries district 
Holzheim, Neu-Ulm, in the district of Neu-Ulm
Holzheim am Forst, in the district of Regensburg

Rhineland-Palatinate
Holzheim, Rhineland-Palatinate
Holzheim Castle (Langerwehe), a castle in the district of Düren, north Rhineland-Westphalia

Hesse
, Hersfeld-Rotenburg district
Schloss Holzheim (hunting seat) of King Frederick I of Sweden

Belgium
 , a village of Büllingen in Verviers, Liège